Players and pairs who neither have high enough rankings nor receive wild cards may participate in a qualifying tournament held one week before the annual Wimbledon Tennis Championships.

Seeds

  Olivier Patience (second round)
  Nicolas Mahut (qualified)
  Édouard Roger-Vasselin (qualified)
  Frank Dancevic (qualifying competition, lucky loser)
  Daniele Bracciali (qualifying competition)
  Santiago Giraldo (second round)
  Kevin Kim (qualifying competition, lucky loser)
  Federico Luzzi (qualifying competition)
  Konstantinos Economidis (first round)
  Alejandro Falla (qualified)
  Paul Capdeville (qualifying competition)
  Rik de Voest (qualified)
  Adrián García (withdrew)
  Mischa Zverev (qualified)
  Fernando Vicente (qualified)
  Tomáš Zíb (qualified)
  Thiago Alves (first round)
  Bobby Reynolds (qualified)
  Wesley Moodie (second round)
  Stefano Galvani (qualifying competition)
  Ilija Bozoljac (first round)
  Bohdan Ulihrach (qualified)
  Thierry Ascione (second round)
  Roko Karanušić (second round)
  Ramón Delgado (first round)
  Wang Yeu-tzuoo (qualified)
  Gilles Müller (qualified)
  Pablo Andújar (second round, withdrew)
  Łukasz Kubot (first round)
  Lukáš Lacko (first round)
  Ricardo Mello (second round)
  Dick Norman (second round)

Qualifiers

  Wang Yeu-tzuoo
  Nicolas Mahut
  Édouard Roger-Vasselin
  Aisam-ul-Haq Qureshi
  Bobby Reynolds
  Bohdan Ulihrach
  Sam Warburg
  Zack Fleishman
  Lee Childs
  Alejandro Falla
  Gilles Müller
  Rik de Voest
  Wayne Arthurs
  Mischa Zverev
  Fernando Vicente
  Tomáš Zíb

Lucky loser

  Frank Dancevic
  Kevin Kim

Qualifying draw

First qualifier

Second qualifier

Third qualifier

Fourth qualifier

Fifth qualifier

Sixth qualifier

Seventh qualifier

Eighth qualifier

Ninth qualifier

Tenth qualifier

Eleventh qualifier

Twelfth qualifier

Thirteenth qualifier

Fourteenth qualifier

Fifteenth qualifier

Sixteenth qualifier

External links

 2007 Wimbledon Championships – Men's draws and results at the International Tennis Federation

Men's Singles Qualifying
Wimbledon Championship by year – Men's singles qualifying